Water-use efficiency (WUE) refers to the ratio of water used in plant metabolism to water lost by the plant through transpiration. Two types of water-use efficiency are referred to most frequently:

photosynthetic water-use efficiency (also called instantaneous water-use efficiency), which is defined as the ratio of the rate of carbon assimilation (photosynthesis) to the rate of transpiration, and
 water-use efficiency of productivity (also called integrated water-use efficiency), which is typically defined as the ratio of biomass produced to the rate of transpiration.

Increases in water-use efficiency are commonly cited as a response mechanism of plants to moderate to severe soil water deficits and have been the focus of many programs that seek to increase crop tolerance to drought. However, there is some question as to the benefit of increased water-use efficiency of plants in agricultural systems, as the processes of increased yield production and decreased water loss due to transpiration (that is, the main driver of increases in water-use efficiency) are fundamentally opposed. If there existed a situation where water deficit induced lower transpirational rates without simultaneously decreasing photosynthetic rates and biomass production, then water-use efficiency would be both greatly improved and the desired trait in crop production.

References

Further reading 
 
 

Plant physiology
Geochemistry